Malcolm James Washer (born 12 August 1945), Australian politician, was a Liberal member of the Australian House of Representatives from October 1998 to August 2013, representing the Division of Moore, Western Australia. He was born in Bunbury, Western Australia, and was educated at the University of Western Australia, graduating in 1970 with degrees in medicine and surgery. He was a general practitioner before entering politics.

He is considered a moderate Liberal in a very conservative state and is supportive of socially liberal issues such as same-sex marriage.
During 2010 and 2011 he was the contact for the Australian Parliamentary Group on Drug Law Reform (APGDLR), a cross party group of 100 MPs from Australian State and Commonwealth parliaments. The group was set up in 1993 after a meeting in Canberra convened by Michael Moore (ACT Assembly) and Ann Symonds (MLC, NSW).

In August 2011, he announced he would not be contesting the next federal election.

In March 2014, Washer announced his resignation as chair of the Alcohol and Other Drug Council of Australia. He said the reason was the "ill-informed" decision of Assistant Health Minister Fiona Nash to cut the organisation's funding without notice, noting that her decision was "a bloody tragedy" which "wasn't subject to any review ... it was dumb advising dumber, and dumb won."

As at January 2018, Washer was chair of ASX-listed AusCann, a medical cannabis company.

References

1945 births
Living people
Australian general practitioners
Liberal Party of Australia members of the Parliament of Australia
Members of the Australian House of Representatives
Members of the Australian House of Representatives for Moore
People from Bunbury, Western Australia
21st-century Australian politicians
20th-century Australian politicians